Bela fortis is a species of sea snail, a marine gastropod mollusk in the family Conidae, the cone snails and their allies.

The name of this species is considered a nomen dubium.

Distribution
This species occurs in the Aegean Sea

References

External links
 Biolib.cz : Image of a shell of Bela fortis
  Tucker, J.K. 2004 Catalog of recent and fossil turrids (Mollusca: Gastropoda). Zootaxa 682:1-1295.

fortis